The Bennett–McBride House is a house in the Central neighborhood of Minneapolis, Minnesota, United States.  It is listed on the National Register of Historic Places and is a contributing property to the Healy Block Residential Historic District.  This house was listed on the National Register in 1977, before the rest of the block was listed in 1993.

History
Theron P. Healy moved to the city of Minneapolis in 1884 and decided to capitalize on the need for housing in the fast-growing city.  Queen Anne style architecture in the United States was rapidly becoming popular after the Centennial Exposition in Philadelphia in 1876.  The Bennett-McBride house was built in 1891 for local lumberman H.H. Bennett.  While the exterior is similar to most of the Queen Anne houses on the block, the interior has some distinguishing features, particularly in its woodwork.  The dining room features quarter-sawn oak, and the lacy fretwork has been well preserved, both on the inside and outside.

The house was selected in the Goodwill Industries Designer Showcase Home in 1976, as a local part of the American Bicentennial celebration.  In 1977 it was listed on the National Register of Historic Places for local significance in architecture as one of Minneapolis's leading examples of Queen Anne-style residences.  Its recognition spurred research into other homes on the block. City of Minneapolis Designation:

See also
 National Register of Historic Places listings in Hennepin County, Minnesota

References

Houses completed in 1891
Houses in Minneapolis
Houses on the National Register of Historic Places in Minnesota
Individually listed contributing properties to historic districts on the National Register in Minnesota
National Register of Historic Places in Minneapolis
Queen Anne architecture in Minnesota